Thomas or Tom Cox may refer to:

 Tom Cox (highwayman) (died 1690), English highwayman
 Thomas Cox (topographer) (c. 1655–1734), English clergyman, topographer and translator
 Thomas Cox (priest) ([fl. 1671–1719), Vicar of Drogheda and Dean of Ferns
 Thomas Cox (politician) (1787–1844), American politician
 Thomas J. Cox (1876–1930), American politician and hotel owner from New York
 Tom Cox (British politician) (1930–2018), British Labour Party politician
 Tom Cox (Kansas politician), member of the Kansas House of Representatives
 Thomas Cox (racing driver) (born 1936), NASCAR driver
 Tom Cox (writer) (born 1975), British humour writer
 Tom Cox (rugby union) (born 1988), Australian rugby union player
 Tom Cox (American football) (1962–2020), American football player